Hugo Ayala Castro (born 31 March 1987) is a Mexican former professional footballer who played as a centre-back.

A clean and technical defender, Ayala is best known for his seasons and achievements with Liga MX side Tigres UANL. Since February 2023, he works as assistant for Tigres' head coach Marco Antonio Ruiz.

Club career

Atlas
Hugo Ayala started his professional career with Atlas. He made his official debut in 2006 as a starter against C.D. Guadalajara. Although Atlas lost 3–1 he became an often used substitute ending the season. In the next season he starting showing great talent in defending and became a starter in Atlas's defensive line up, leading Atlas all the way to the quarter finals to face Club América, but lost to them in an aggregate score of (7–4). Throughout his career with Atlas he was mostly used as a substitute until the manager, Ricardo La Volpe, took his place as manager of Atlas. La Volpe then started having confidence in Ayala, and made Ayala a starter and captain for Atlas.

Tigres UANL
On 2010, he arrived to Tigres UANL and by 2011 he already was the starter centre-back along with Juninho, both key players for the Apertura 2011 championship. Ayala was named best defender of the Apertura 2011 season alongside teammate Jorge Torres Nilo. Ayala, a starter in Tigres since 2011, later would become champion with the team in the Apertura 2015, Apertura 2016, Apertura 2017 and Clausura 2019 seasons besides runner-up of the 2015 Copa Libertadores. He retired in 2023, and became assistant for Tigres' head coach Marco Antonio Ruiz.

International career
In May 2018, Ayala was named in Mexico's preliminary 28-man squad for the World Cup in Russia, and was ultimately included in the final 23-man roster revealed on 4 June. He would go on to appear in the opening group stage match against Germany, where Mexico won 1–0 and the round-of-16 loss against Brazil.

Career statistics

Scores and results list Mexico's goal tally first, score column indicates score after each Ayala goal.

Honours
Tigres UANL
Liga MX: Apertura 2011, Apertura 2015, Apertura 2016, Apertura 2017, Clausura 2019
Copa MX: Clausura 2014
Campeón de Campeones: 2016, 2017, 2018
CONCACAF Champions League: 2020
Campeones Cup: 2018

Individual
Mexican Primera División Best Rookie: Clausura 2007
Mexican Primera División Best Center-back: Apertura 2011
Liga MX Best Defender: 2017–18
Liga MX Best XI: Apertura 2015, Apertura 2017, Clausura 2019
CONCACAF Best XI: 2018
CONCACAF Champions League Team of the Tournament: 2020

References

External links

1987 births
Living people
Sportspeople from Morelia
Footballers from Michoacán
Mexican footballers
Association football central defenders
Mexico international footballers
Mexico youth international footballers
2015 Copa América players
2017 CONCACAF Gold Cup players
2018 FIFA World Cup players
Pan American Games bronze medalists for Mexico
Pan American Games medalists in football
Footballers at the 2007 Pan American Games
Medalists at the 2007 Pan American Games
Liga MX players
Atlas F.C. footballers
Tigres UANL footballers